Decollidrillia nigra is a species of sea snail, a marine gastropod mollusk in the family Turridae, the turrids.

Description
The length of the shell varies between 10 mm and 14 mm.

Distribution
This marine species occurs in the Sea of Japan and off the Kuriles, Russia

References

 Hasegawa K. (2009) Upper bathyal gastropods of the Pacific coast of northern Honshu, Japan, chiefly collected by R/V Wakataka-maru. In: T. Fujita (ed.), Deep-sea fauna and pollutants off Pacific coast of northern Japan. National Museum of Nature and Science Monographs 39: 225-383
 Medinskaya, Alexandra I. "Foregut anatomy of the Turrinae (Gastropoda, Conoidea, Turridae)." Ruthenica 12 (2002): 135-159.
 Medinskaya, Alexandra I. "Structure of the venom gland-muscular bulb complex in the family Turridae (Gastropoda, Conoidea)." Ruthenica 12.2 (2002): 125-133.

External links
 
 Petit, Richard E., and Rudiger Bieler. "On The New Names Introduced in the Various Printings of" Shells of the World in Colour"[Vol. I by Tadashige Habe and Kiyoshi Ito; Vol. II by Tadashige Habe and Sadao Kosuge." MALACOLOGIA-PHILADELPHIA- 38 (1996): 35-46.]

nigra
Gastropods described in 1965